Anchor Brewing Company is an American alcoholic beverage producer, operating a brewery on Potrero Hill in San Francisco, California. The brewery was founded in 1896 and was purchased by Frederick Louis Maytag III in 1965, saving it from closure. It moved to its current location in 1979. It is one of the last remaining breweries to produce California common beer, also known as Steam Beer, a trademark owned by the company.

In 2010, the company was purchased by The Griffin Group, an investment and consulting company focused on beverage alcohol brands. The brewery became one facet of the Anchor Brewers & Distillers, LLC portfolio.

On 3 August 2017, it was acquired by Japanese brewing giant Sapporo Breweries for US$85 million.

History
Anchor began during the California Gold Rush when Gottlieb Brekle arrived from Germany and began brewing in San Francisco. In 1896, Ernst F. Baruth and his son-in-law, Otto Schinkel, Jr., bought an old brewery at 1431 Pacific Avenue and named it Anchor Brewery. The brewery burned down in the fires that followed the 1906 earthquake, but was rebuilt at a different location in 1907. There is no record of what Anchor did during Prohibition, but it resumed serving Steam Beer after Repeal, possibly as the only steam brewing company still in operation. However the brewery burned down yet again within the year, and it relocated once more, this time to a building a few blocks away.

The brewery continued operations into the late 1950s, but suffered heavily from the country's increasingly strong preference for the light lagers produced by the megabreweries. Whereas there had been more than 4,000 breweries at the turn of the twentieth century, only 70 remained by the 1960s.

Anchor shut its doors briefly in 1959, but was bought and reopened the following year.  By 1965, however, it was doing so poorly that it nearly closed again. Anchor's situation continued to deteriorate largely because the current owners lacked the expertise, equipment, and attention to cleanliness that were required to produce consistent batches of beer for commercial consumption. The brewery gained a reputation for producing sour, bad beer.

In 1965, Frederick Louis "Fritz" Maytag III bought the brewery, saving it from closure. He purchased 51 percent of the brewery for several thousand dollars, and later purchased the brewery outright. It moved to its current location near Potrero Hill in 1979.

Turning the failing brewery around required more than the money in Maytag's fortune. He also had to change the character of the beer that was produced there. Between purchasing Anchor and producing the first batches of bottled Anchor Steam in 1971, Maytag had to learn the brewing process from scratch, invest in improvements to the equipment, and focus heavily on cleanliness in the brewing process. The new beer was a definitive representative of California common beer, a derivative of historic steam beer.

Before offering in bottles, sales were only as draft beer to thirty local establishments that had long carried the brand. Total production was only 800 barrels in 1969, 1,200 in 1970, and 2,100 in 1971. The bottles were initially sold in four-packs, to keep the price close to mainstream six-packs.

During the 1980s Anchor Steam Beer began to achieve national notice and demand increased from only a few thousand cases per year that had been produced in the old location. It was the first of the modern microbreweries, being among the first American breweries to produce a porter, barley wine, or India pale ale with regularity. Its success inspired many others to enter the brewing business, notably New Albion.

In 1989, the company produced a limited edition of beer (known in Sumerian as sikaru) which they named Ninkasi after the Sumerian goddess of beer. It was based on a scholarly reconstruction of an ancient Sumerian recipe known as the "hymn to Ninkasi". The recipe started with a twice-baked bread known as bappir as well as malt, and was sweetened with honey and dates. It did not include hops or other bittering ingredients, so it was considerably sweeter than modern beers. The recipe is described by Charlie Papazian. Also in 1989, the brewing process for a batch of Steam was interrupted during the Loma Prieta earthquake. The resulting (altered) brew was released as normal Anchor Steam, but with an inverted label; this beer has come to be referred to as Earthquake Beer.

In 1993, the company opened Anchor Distillery, a microdistillery in the same location as the brewery, and began making a single malt rye whiskey, named Old Potrero after the hill. In 1997, the microdistillery began producing gin, called Junípero—Spanish for juniper, and a reference to Fr. Junípero Serra, an important figure in San Francisco's and California's history. Recently they have also begun producing a Jenever style gin called Genevieve, using wheat, barley, rye, and the same herbal ingredients as their Junípero gin.

In 2010, Maytag sold the company to former Skyy vodka executives Keith Greggor and Tony Foglio, from Novato, California, who planned to expand Anchor's business while keeping its commitment to artisan brewing. In 2013, the brewery launched Anchor California Lager, a re-creation of a historic Boca Brewing lager from the 1870s. The brewery also announced a major expansion plan at Pier 48 in the Mission Rock neighborhood near Oracle Park, which would expand Anchor's maximum annual production capacity from 180,000 barrels to 680,000 barrels.

In 2014, Anchor officially announced Anchor IPA, the first India Pale Ale in the brewery's history. Anchor ended production of its winter seasonal Bock in 2014 and replaced it a year later with Anchor Winter Wheat.

In 2017, Anchor was purchased by Sapporo.

In 2019, Anchor Brewing workers voted by an almost 2-to-1 margin to join the International Longshore and Warehouse Union, making Anchor Brewing – including Anchor Public Taps, the brewery's on-site brew pub – the first unionized craft brewery in the United States.

In 2021, Anchor Brewing announced a major makeover of their logo and beer labels. On the eve of their 125th birthday, the brewery replaced their vintage-looking labels with a large Anchor logo in a two-tone color schemes per beer. Most labels were not changed in decades or at all. The beer itself remained unchanged.

Products
Anchor has a year-round range of seven beers, as well as several seasonal beers. In 2012, Anchor introduced the Zymaster series, which places an emphasis on brewing tradition.  These beers are generally of an extremely limited nature.

Core beers

Seasonal beers

Zymaster Series
 No. 1: California Lager
 No. 2: Mark's Mild
 No. 3: Flying Cloud San Francisco Stout
 No. 4: Fort Ross Farmhouse Ale
 No. 5: Harvest One American Pale Ale
 No. 6: Saaremaa Ale
 No. 7: Potrero Hill Sour Mash IPA
 No. 8: Luxardo Cherry Ale

See also

 California breweries
 Barrel-aged beer

References

External links
 

Beer brewing companies based in the San Francisco Bay Area
Food and drink companies based in San Francisco
Manufacturing companies based in San Francisco
American companies established in 1896
Food and drink companies established in 1896
1896 establishments in California
Cuisine of the San Francisco Bay Area
Sapporo Breweries